Garra aethiopica is a species of ray-finned fish in the genus Garra. It is endemic to Ethiopia where it is found in the basins of the Awash River and Tekeze River.

References 

Garra
Fish of Ethiopia
Endemic fauna of Ethiopia
Taxa named by Jacques Pellegrin
Fish described in 1927